Albert Khanbulatovich Batyrgaziev is a Russian professional boxer who won a gold medal in the featherweight division at the 2020 Summer Olympics in Tokyo.

Amateur/Olympic career
Batyrgaziev was a champion kickboxer as a teenager before he took up boxing in earnest in 2016. As an amateur, Batyrgaziev represented Russia at the 2019 World Championships. After making his professional debut in 2020, Batyrgaziev secured a place at the 2020 Summer Olympics in 2021 by winning a gold medal at the 2020 European Qualification Tournament.

Batyrgaziev won his first two fights in Tokyo to reach the semifinals, where he came from behind to beat Cuban three-time Olympic medalist Lázaro Álvarez 3:2 in a close bout. In the featherweight final, Batyrgaziev beat Duke Ragan of the United States 3:2 to become the first professional boxer in Olympic history to win a gold medal.

Professional career

Featherweight
Batyrgaziev made his professional debut on 3 July 2020, scoring a seventh-round stoppage victory via corner retirement (RTD) against Armen Ataev to capture the vacant WBA Asia East super-featherweight title at the Soviet Wings Sport Palace in Moscow, Russia.

His second fight came against Erzhan Turgumbekov on 22 August 2020 in Kazan, Russia. In a fight which saw Turgumbekov receive a point deduction in the sixth round for hitting below the belt, Batyrgaziev went on to win via technical knockout (TKO) at 1 minute and 38 seconds in the tenth and final round.

He next faced Sibusiso Zingange on 29 January 2021 at the Soviet Wings Sport Palace in Moscow. Batyrgaziev knocked his opponent down in the seventh round with a punch to the body. Zingange made it back to his feet before the referee's count of ten, only to be knocked to the floor for a second time as his corner threw in the towel, handing Batyrgaziev a seventh-round TKO victory.

Batyrgaziev was scheduled to face Suat Laze for the vacant WBO European featherweight title on 11 October 2021, at the Ice Palace Salavat Yulaev in Ufa, Russia. The bout was set as the co-main event of a card dedicated to the Bashkortostan National Day, and was broadcast by Match TV. Batyrgaziev won the fight by a second-round knockout.

Batyrgaziev was booked face Franklin Manzanilla for the vacant IBF International featherweight title on 24 December 2021, at the USC Soviet Wings in Moscow, Russia. The bout was scheduled as the co-main event of a 14-fight Match TV broadcast fight card. He won the fight by a fourth-round technical knockout, as Manzanilla's corner threw in the towel at the 2:25 minute mark.

Super featherweight
Batyrgaziev faced Heybatulla Hajialiyev for the vacant EBP lightweight title on 3 April 2022, at the USC Soviet Wings in Moscow, Russia. He won the fight by unanimous decision, with scores of 99–91, 100–90 and 100–90. Batyrgaziev next faced Ricardo Nunez in a lightweight bout on 11 November 2022. He won the fight by unanimous decision.

Batyrgaziev faced the former WBA super featherweight champion Jezzrel Corrales on 4 February 2023. He won the fight by a ninth-round technical knockout, as Corrales' corner threw in the towel 28 seconds into the penultimate round.

Professional boxing record

References

Living people
Year of birth missing (living people)
Date of birth missing (living people)
Sportspeople from Dagestan
Russian male boxers
Bantamweight boxers
Featherweight boxers
Super-featherweight boxers
Southpaw boxers
People from Dagestan
Boxers at the 2020 Summer Olympics
Olympic boxers of Russia
Medalists at the 2020 Summer Olympics
Olympic gold medalists for the Russian Olympic Committee athletes
Olympic medalists in boxing
Nogai people
20th-century Russian people
21st-century Russian people